Cleveland "Cleve" Lewis (born November 1, 1955) is an American retired professional soccer player who was the first African American drafted by the North American Soccer League.

Career
Lewis was born November 1, 1955 in Birmingham, Alabama. Raised in Willingboro Township, New Jersey, he attended John F. Kennedy High School, scoring more than 100 goals in his high school career and earning all-state honors as a senior.

Lewis was an All-America selection at Brandeis University and captain of the 1976 NCAA Division III Men's Soccer Championship winning team. He was named MVP of the championship final, scoring both goals, including the golden goal in double overtime. By the time he graduated he was the school's all-time leader in goals with 58.

In January 1978 he was selected by the Soccer Bowl '77 champion, Cosmos in the first round of the NASL's 1978 college draft, but never played for them. Acquired by the Memphis Rogues of the North American Soccer League, he appeared in three regular season matches for Memphis in 1978. He joined the New Jersey Americans of the American Soccer League in 1979. After a brief stay in the preseason camp of the Houston Hurricane in 1980, Lewis decided to retire from professional soccer.

In 1993 he was inducted into the Brandeis University Athletics Hall of Fame as an inaugural member.

Personal life
Lewis is the son of former U.S. hurdler Evelyn Lawler, and the older brother of U.S. Olympic gold medalist Carl Lewis, and U.S. Olympian Carol Lewis. He was named after his mother's Tuskegee University track and field coach, Cleveland Abbott.

References

External links
 NASL stats

1955 births
Living people
African-American soccer players
American Soccer League (1933–1983) players
New Jersey Americans (ASL) players
Soccer players from Birmingham, Alabama
Sportspeople from Burlington County, New Jersey
Brandeis University alumni
Memphis Rogues players
North American Soccer League (1968–1984) players
People from Willingboro Township, New Jersey
Soccer players from New Jersey
Willingboro High School alumni
American soccer players
Association football forwards